David Duff Holt (born 3 January 1936) is a Scottish former international footballer who played as a left back. During his playing career, Holt made more than 300 appearances in the Scottish Football League for Queen's Park, Heart of Midlothian and Partick Thistle between 1957 and 1970.

At Hearts (who were reigning Scottish champions at the time he joined the club), Holt won the 1962–63 Scottish League Cup during his nine-year spell at Tynecastle Park and was an important member of the team which only missed out on the 1964–65 Scottish Division One title on goal average. However, he was released on a free transfer in 1969 and later stated he felt he had been badly treated by the club.

Holt, who earned five caps for Scottish national side, also represented Great Britain at the 1960 Summer Olympics (being able to do so as he played for Queen's Park who operated on an amateur basis).

He later worked as a taxi driver for many years.

References

External links
 
 David Duff Holt, Scotland record London Hearts
 David Holt, London Hearts
 

1936 births
Living people
Footballers from Glasgow
People from Gorbals
Association football fullbacks
Scottish footballers
Scotland international footballers
Scottish Junior Football Association players
Lugar Boswell Thistle F.C. players
Queen's Park F.C. players
Heart of Midlothian F.C. players
Partick Thistle F.C. players
Scottish Football League players
Scottish Football League representative players
Footballers at the 1960 Summer Olympics
Olympic footballers of Great Britain
Scotland under-23 international footballers
Scotland amateur international footballers